Rettet Die Umwelt is a card game published in 1990 by Piatnik.

Contents
Rettet Die Umwelt is a game in which each player must clean up their own ecosystem, while stopping other players from cleaning theirs.

Reception
Jonathan Turner reviewed Rettet Die Umwelt for Games International magazine, and gave it a rating of 4 out of 10, and stated that "it is extremely heartening to see a game concerned with environmental issues on the market, especially one as well presented as this – the cards are beautifully, and thoroughly, illustrated – but because of its faults, I am still waiting for a game in which the environment is cleaned up in a realistic way."

References

Card games introduced in 1990